

The Akin Free Library on Quaker Hill is a historic eclectic late Victorian stone building in the hamlet of Quaker Hill, town of Pawling, Dutchess County, New York, USA, listed in the National Register of Historic Places as a historic place of local significance since 1991.

The Akin Free Library was a gift from the Quaker Albert J. Akin (1803–1903), founder of the Bank of Pawling and the Mizzentop Hotel on Quaker Hill. The building was designed by the architect John A. Wood and constructed between 1898 and 1908.  It is a 2½-story, T-plan, stone building on a raised basement with an engaged three-story central clock tower and rear annex.  The building features an entrance portico, bracketed sheet copper cornice, and standing seam copper roof.  Its design is Victorian eclectic.

It was added to the National Register of Historic Places in 1991.

The library itself is located on the first floor of the building. Among others, its holdings of several thousand books contain books of local interest and by local authors, a children's section, and newspaper collections.

Museums
The Historical Society Museum occupies the second floor of the building.  Its collections include objects pertaining to the local history such as period and Quaker clothing, tools and artwork, bowling pins from the Mizzentop Hotel, and the service window from the old Quaker Hill Post Office.

The lower floor of the building houses the Olive Gunnison Natural History Museum, which displays about 200 mounted birds, rocks and minerals, as well as a shrunken human head.

External links
online article by the Historical Society of Quaker Hill and Pawling
travel article in the New York Times
online travel article on Pawling
web page on the bird collection of the Gunnison Natural History Museum

References

Libraries on the National Register of Historic Places in New York (state)
Private libraries in the United States
Museums in Dutchess County, New York
Natural history museums in New York (state)
History museums in New York (state)
Library buildings completed in 1908
Pawling, New York
National Register of Historic Places in Dutchess County, New York
1908 establishments in New York (state)